Teddy Boys Don't Knit is the third solo album by Vivian Stanshall. As with his 1974 debut solo album Men Opening Umbrellas Ahead, it consists entirely of songs, rather than the comedy-narrative-with-integral-songs of its immediate predecessor Sir Henry at Rawlinson End.

Background
Teddy Boys Don't Knit was written during Stanshall’s residence at his Thames river houseboat Searchlight with his second wife Ki Longfellow, his stepdaughter Sydney and his infant daughter Silky - a period which Longfellow has described as Stanshall’s "first, real and only taste of family life." Consequently, several songs on the album have domestic themes: "The Tube" (written for and about Silky Stanshall and her infant digestive process), "Bewilderbeeste" and "Calypso to Colapso" (for and about his love of Ki), "Fresh Faced Boys" (dealing with Stanshall’s struggle against his own father’s wishes for him to be well-groomed, well-behaved and socially presentable) and "Possibly an Armchair", in which Stanshall muses on ageing and on whether in old age he is likely to become the same kind of person as his elderly father had himself become.

The album was recorded at Morgan Studios, Willesden Green in 1981 and released in between Stanshall's two spoken-word comedy albums, Sir Henry at Rawlinson End and Sir Henry at N'didi’s Kraal (and shortly after the shooting of the film version of Sir Henry at Rawlinson End). Although not part of the Rawlinson End sequence in itself, Teddy Boys Don't Knit does feature several songs written (and in some cases used) for the project: "Gums", "The Cracks Are Showing" and "Terry Keeps His Clips On" (a song inspired by Terry clips). Several other songs emphasize Stanshall’s love of language and language games. The title of "Flung a Dummy" is taken from an unusual phrase which Stanshall had heard a stranger on a train use as a euphemism for dying, while "Ginger Geezer" is written almost entirely in Cockney rhyming slang. Other songs parody and mock the lifestyle of the rock-and-roll musician.

As he had on Men Opening Umbrellas Ahead, Stanshall made use of the musical talents of his fellow former Bonzo Dog Band members Neil Innes and Roger Ruskin Spear, his frequently-called-on musical director Pete Moss and multi-instrumentalist Jim Cuomo. Other contributors to the album include Yes keyboard player Rick Wakeman, guitarist Ollie Halsall, Traffic/Can bass guitarist Rosko Gee, John Kirkpatrick on concertina, as well as Ki's friend and old Hampstead flatmate Richard Thompson.

The album title is derived from Stanshall's boyhood in the Thames Estuary town of Leigh-on-Sea, where he was a member of a Teddy Boy gang but baffled his fellow gang members with his chosen pastime of knitting.

Track listing
Attitude 1
 "King Kripple" - 2:52
 "Slave Valse" - 4:38
 "Gums" - 2:06
 "Bewilderbeeste" - 2:57
 "Calypso to Colapso" - 3:00
 "The Tube" - 3:26
 "Ginger Geezer" - 3:04
 "The Cracks Are Showing" - 0:46
 "Flung a Dummy" - 3:10

Bttitude 2
"Possibly an Armchair & Embodying Fresh Faced Boys" - 5:16
 "Terry Keeps His Clips On" - 3:34
 "Bass Macaw & Broken Bottles" - 2:55
 "Nose Hymn" - 2:21
 "Everyday, I Have the Blows" - 5:01
 "Smoke Signals at Night" - 3:12
 "Nouveau Riffe" - 3:33

Personnel

Musicians
Vivian Stanshall - vocals, horns, banjo, mandolin, kazoo, harp, piano, engineer, artwork
Ollie Halsall, Richard Thompson - guitars
Pete Moss - keyboards, bass, guitar, percussion, orchestration
Rosko Gee - bass
”Admiral” John Halsey - drums
Jim Cuomo - reeds, piano
Neil Innes - piano
John Kirkpatrick - concertina, melodeon
Roger Ruskin Spear - xylophone and cornet on track 6, tenor saxophone on track 9
Lennox Langton - steel drums on track 5
Charmain Sheenhan - vocals on track 5 
Rick Wakeman - piano on track 15

Production 
Malcolm Brown - producer
Andrew Sheehan - co-producer, percussion
Martyn Webster - engineer

References

External links
"Vivian Stanshall – Teddy Boys Don't Knit" at discogs.com

Vivian Stanshall albums
1981 albums
Charisma Records albums